Nahla Chahal is a Lebanese writer, journalist, researcher and activist, born to an Iraqi mother and  Lebanese father, who were both communist militants. She was one of the leaders of the Organization of Communist Action of Lebanon and a participant in the Lebanese Communist Party. She is also a columnist at Al Hayat pan Arabic newspaper, which is published in London. She taught at the Lebanese University for eleven years, then she later moved to Paris to focus more on research and is now president of the Arab Women Researchers Association.

She is sister of late film director Randa Chahal and currently resides in Paris, France, where Randa died.

Publications
 Une Irakité latente (2003), which was published in Le Moyen-Orient sous le choc
 La formidable capacité d’intégration du système libanais (2002)
 Avril à Jénine (2000)

References

External links
Writings by Nahla Chahal

Year of birth missing (living people)
Lebanese activists
Lebanese journalists
Lebanese women journalists
Living people
Lebanese people of Iraqi descent
Academic staff of Lebanese University
Lebanese emigrants to France